Artabazes (died 542), whose name is often latinised as Ardabastos, was a Sasanian cavalryman and later a Byzantine military officer, recorded taking part in the Roman-Persian Wars and Gothic War. He was killed just prior to the Battle of Faventia. The main source about him is Procopius.

Biography
Artabazes was a Persarmenian. He originally served as a cavalryman (aswār) in the garrison of Sisauranon, a frontier stronghold of the Sasanian Empire which was captured by Belisarius. Together with his commander Bleschames and 800 other cavalrymen, he was sent to Italy to fight alongside the Byzantines. He is first recorded in 542 as an archon of the Byzantine army, but his rank is not specified in primary sources. He was one of the Byzantine troops marching against the city of Verona, an Ostrogoth stronghold. The Byzantine forces consisted of about 12,000 men, with Constantianus and Alexander as co-commanders.

The Byzantines managed to bribe or otherwise win over Marcianus, one of the sentinels of the city. He was to open a city gate at night so that a small Byzantine unit would seize the gate and prepare the entry for the rest of the army. Artabazes was chosen to lead the operation and his unit for the night consisted of 100 hand-picked men. The small force entered the city, but the rest of the Byzantine army failed to arrive on time. The co-commanders were allegedly involved in a nightly dispute over how to divide the plunder once the city was taken. The delay proved disastrous and the Gothic garrison had time to organize itself and advance against Artabazes through the city gate which was still open, leaving the Byzantine unit trapped within the city. The subsequent fighting was an anomaly, as the Artabazes' men had to resist anattack from  the city. Artabazes and his men retreated towards the battlement. Their only way of escape was to jump down from the city walls. They did so, with several of them killed by the fall.

Artabazes survived the battle mostly unhurt and returned to the Byzantine camp. He bitterly criticized the delay that cost them victory. The Byzantine army retreated towards Faventia and eventually camped next to a stream variously known as Anemo or Lamone. There, they were met by King Totila of the Ostrogoths (r. 541–552), marching against them with about 5,000 men. Artabazes is recorded urging his superiors to attack the enemy forces while they were still crossing the river. He argued that the disorder would gain their side an advantage, but his idea was ultimately rejected.

While the rival armies were preparing for battle, Artabazes was engaged in single combat on horseback against Valaris. The latter was a champion of the Goths, reportedly a giant of a man, whose appearance terrified his opponents. Artabazes accepted the challenge and managed to slay his opponent, but he himself was accidentally wounded in the throat and died three days later. Procopius praises him as a good soldier.

Ultimately, Totila won the Battle of Faventia and even managed to capture the imperial standards. He then took the initiative of invading Tuscany and besieging Florence.

References

Sources

 

542 deaths
6th-century Byzantine military personnel
Byzantine people of Armenian descent
People of the Gothic War (535–554)
Byzantines killed in battle
Year of birth unknown
6th-century Armenian people
Byzantine people of Iranian descent
Generals of Khosrow I
Duellists